The Caura antbird (Myrmelastes caurensis) is a species of bird in the family Thamnophilidae. It is found in Brazil and Venezuela. Its natural habitat is subtropical or tropical moist lowland forests.

References

Caura antbird
Birds of the Venezuelan Amazon
Caura antbird
Caura antbird
Taxonomy articles created by Polbot